The Dinosaur Trail is a circular tourist route in the province of Alberta, Canada, located in the Canadian badlands paralleling the Red Deer River on both sides, from Drumheller to the Bleriot Ferry.  It is divided in two segments, with the South Dinosaur Trail following the south side of the river and uses portions of Highway 575 and Highway 837, while North Dinosaur Trail follows the north side of the river and is the entirety of Highway 838.  The north and south segments of Dinosaur Trail are connected by the Highway 9 / Highway 56 concurrency within Drumheller.

Route description 

The Dinosaur Trail begins at the 2 Street SW / South Railway Avenue intersection (Highway 9 / 56) in Drumheller and travels west along South Railway Avenue (Highway 575).  On the western outskirts of the Drumheller townsite, it passes the amphitheatre which houses the Canadian Badlands Passion Play, and continues past the former hamlet of Nacmine, which is now within Drumheller.  At the Highway 575/837 intersection, the Dinosaur Trail turns onto Highway 837 while Highway 575 heads west towards Carbon.  The Dinosaur Trail continues northwest along the Red Deer River to the intersection of Highway 837/838 intersection, where it turns east onto Highway 838.  It crosses the Red Deer River on the free, cable-operated Bleriot Ferry, which has been running since 1913 and operates from late April to November.  North of the river, the Dinosaur Trail briefly exits the valley and re-enters it near Horsethief Canyon.  The Dinosaur Trail passes through Midland Provincial Park and past the Royal Tyrrell Museum of Palaeontology before ending at Highway 9 / 56 back in Drumheller.  The loop is completed by following Highway 9 / 56 (Bridge Street and 2nd Street W) across the Red Deer River, through downtown Drumheller, and rejoining Highway 575.

Major intersections 
Beginning at the 2 Street SW and South Railway Avenue intersection in Drumheller and travelling clockwise.

References

External links 

 Travel Alberta - Canadian Badlands

Roads in Alberta
Drumheller